Douglas Basil Nagle (April 5, 1933 – April 11, 1997) was a Canadian football player who played for the Winnipeg Blue Bombers, Calgary Stampeders and BC Lions. He won the Grey Cup with Winnipeg in 1961. He died of liver failure in 1997.

References

1933 births
1997 deaths
BC Lions players
Calgary Stampeders players
Players of Canadian football from British Columbia
Canadian football people from Vancouver
Winnipeg Blue Bombers players